Mahmud Shah may refer to:
Mahmud Shah I of Kedah
Mahmud Shah II of Kedah
Mahmud Shah of Malacca (died 1528), sultan of Malacca 1488–1528
Mahmud Shah,, see Jaunpur Sultanate
Mahmud of Pahang (1868-1917)
Mahmud of Terengganu (1930-1998)
Mahmud Shah of Bengal (1435–1459)
Mir Mahmud Hotaki, Mahmud Shah Hotak, ruler of Persia/Afghanistan from 1717 to 1725
Mahmud Shah Durrani, Ruler of Afghanistan between 1801–1803 and 1809–1818
Muhamud Muzaffar Shah (1823–1864), Sultan of Riau Sultanate

Rulers of Gujarat Sultanate
 Mahmud Shah I (1458-1511), popularly known as Mahmud Begada
 Mahmud Shah II (reigned 1489–1490)
 Mahmud Shah III of Gujarat (1526-1554)